Caprom (a portmanteau of capitalist romanticism) is an architectural style, emerged in Russia after the fall of the Soviet Union, that was a widespread phenomenon until 2008. It is also described as "post-Soviet postmodernism". Buildings that belong to this style often receive a negative assessment of contemporaries as "flashy and lurid".

Examples

References 

Architectural styles